Christy Matson (born 1979) is an American textile artist.

A native of Seattle, Matson studied at the University of Washington and at the California College of the Arts. She has taught at the School of the Art Institute of Chicago; currently she lives and works in Los Angeles. Her pieces begin as drawings and watercolors, which are then transformed into woven works using a Jacquard loom. Matson was among the artists featured in the exhibit "40 Under 40: Craft Futures" at the Renwick Gallery of the Smithsonian Museum of American Art, and one of her pieces was subsequently accessioned by the museum.

References

External links
 Matson website

1979 births
Living people
American textile artists
Women textile artists
21st-century American artists
21st-century American women artists
Artists from Seattle
University of Washington alumni
California College of the Arts alumni
School of the Art Institute of Chicago faculty
American women academics